Libochovice Chateau is a castle in the centre of Libochovice town in the Ústí nad Labem Region of the Czech Republic. It is a cultural monument. It is one of the most significant early Baroque castles in the county.
 
The castle is under the management of National Heritage Institute, it was declared the National Cultural Heritage on 1 January 2002.  The castle is not the main landmark of the town because it is only seen from the other side of the Ohře river.

Libochovice Chateau also boasts with the collections of tapestries, glass and porcelain.
In 1787 Jan Evangelista Purkyně, a major Czech scientist and a scholar, was born in Libochovice.

History
During the gothic times, there was a fortress at the place of recent chateau, and at the year 1550 was listed as deserted. At 1560 were the ruins rebuilt into a chateau. 

In the 17th century, one hundred years after Libochovice was declared the town by Ferdinand I, there was a huge fire, which destroyed almost half of the town. However, it was not for the first time. The town underwent three fires altogether, during which also Libochovice chateau was severely damaged.

He asked Italian architect Antonio della Porta to restore it. Therefore, the Italian influence is evident. Antonio della Porta renewed this chateau between 1683 and 1690, economic buildings were restored between 1690 and 1697.

Next renewing of chateau was between 1900 and 1914 by E. Fiala.

The park was designed in French style by Jan Tulipán. During the 19th century, it was re-designed in English style and later restored again in the original design.

Description

The chateau has four wings and is surrounded by arcades lining the courtyard. The yard is accessible from the entrance gate and leads to the Italian symmetrical garden. There are also four fountains in the garden by stonemason Jakub Mitthofer.

On the east side of the building, there is a balcony with columns and stairs leading to the garden that was built up in the middle of the 19th century. From the north side, the portal of the chateau with a Dietrichstein blazon is visible.
 
In the courtyard there are embosses with the theme of the sea creatures made by Italian artists Jacob Tencalla and Giuseppe Mattoni. Italian embosses and mythological paintings can be found inside the chateau as well.

References

Castles in the Ústí nad Labem Region
National Cultural Monuments of the Czech Republic
Museums in the Ústí nad Labem Region
Historic house museums in the Czech Republic
Litoměřice District